Lewis–Clark State College is a public college in the northwest United States, located in north central Idaho at Lewiston. Founded  in 1893, it has an approximate annual enrollment of 3,600. The college offers more than 130 degrees and is well known for its social work, criminal justice, education, nursing, and technical programs.

History 

In 1893, Governor William J. McConnell signed an act on January 27 authorizing the establishment of the Lewiston State Normal School in Lewiston. There was a catch, however: "Provided the mayor and common council of that city on or before May 1, 1893, donate ten acres, within the city limits and known as part of the city park, and authorizing the said mayor and council to convey to the trustees of said normal school the said tract of land," etc.

The first Trustees on the school's Board were James W. Reid (who had done the most to shepherd the authorization bill through the Idaho Legislature), Norman B. Willey (who had just stepped down as Idaho governor), Benjamin Wilson (a previous gubernatorial candidate), J. Morris Howe, and C. W. Schaff. Reid was elected President of the Board, a position he held until his death in 1902.

Lewiston residents lost no time in obtaining the required space for the school. However, the legislature acted slowly in providing construction funds, and then construction lagged. George E. Knepper had been hired as first President of the Normal School. Frustrated by the delays in getting his building, Knepper leased space in downtown Lewiston and opened for classes on January 6, 1896. The building itself was not ready until May. Over the next several years, more structures were added to the campus, including dormitories and a gymnasium.

In keeping with the normal school philosophy, Lewiston Normal focused on practical, hands-on training for new teachers. That meant the school provided a great deal of “manual training”—what is now called vocational education. Also, to insure that teachers truly knew how to handle a classroom, the school ran an on-campus training school. In it, real teachers taught real pupils, and student teachers also learned-by-doing under the supervision of experienced teacher-critics.

Until the 1920s, one-room schools served well over half of Idaho's primary students. In most, only the teacher knew anything at all about running a school. Thus, “teachers assumed responsibility for shaping a district's entire educational policy.”

The First World War certainly impacted the nation's normal schools, but not as much as it did conventional institutions. Generally, male students were in the majority at regular colleges, many of which experienced brutal enrollment losses. Normal schools attracted a predominantly female student body, so the declines were much smaller—about 15% at Lewiston Normal.

The school experienced a painful crisis on December 5, 1917, when the Administration Building suffered severe damage in a fire,
 later determined to be arson by a student. Its cupola collapsed into the gutted interior of the main structure and the older east wing was totally destroyed. Lewiston Normal survived that disaster and continued to grow, as the demand for pre-college teachers increased. However, by the late 1920s, the "normal school" idea was being supplanted by a "teachers college" approach. Such colleges still focused on teacher education, but now students could earn a bachelor's degree—more and more often required for certification. Recognizing this trend, school supporters began a campaign to change Lewiston Normal's status. They also began the painful process of upgrading the faculty—inciting much ill will.

Supporters also fought an ongoing battle just to keep the school open; some legislators still wanted to close the Normals to save money. The advent of World War II squelched that notion. Not only did the school continue to turn out desperately needed teachers, it also expanded its nurse-training program, and produced large numbers of fliers in its Navy Air School. In 1943, the Board of Education raised the school to full four-year status and became North Idaho Teachers College (NITC). Now with the ability to grant a Bachelor of Education degree, school leaders took it upon themselves to use the name Northern Idaho College of Education (NICE), and the legislature approved the name change in 1947.

The school got another temporary reprieve from the cost-cutters when a deluge of veterans funded by the G.I. Bill hit the campus after the war. However, that wave passed, and in 1951 budget hawks succeeded in closing the school, as well as its counterpart, the Southern Idaho College of Education (SICE), which had previously been called Albion State Normal School, in Albion in southern Idaho. The state's other colleges had assured legislators that they could supply all the teachers needed. That promise proved disastrously wrong: In just three years, the state found itself issuing nearly 40% more provisional teaching certificates than it had in 1951.

The first dean of the school was appointed for the third year in 1957, and enrollment was 319 in the fall of 1961. The arrangement with the university proved difficult and it ended abruptly in 1963 when the affiliation seemed like it might damage the university's academic accreditation.

The ongoing need for teachers, a developing shortage of nurses, and a new push for vocational education from the federal government combined to rescue the school from oblivion. The state legislature voted to elevate it to four-year status in 1963 but did not approve funding until two years later. Enrollment of the now-independent, four-year school grew, from 465 in 1964 to 1,033 in the fall of 1968. It continued to grow and in July 1971 the name was officially changed to Lewis–Clark State College, and was the last normal school in the country to make the change.

Athletics 

The Lewis–Clark State (LCSC) athletic teams are called the Warriors and Lady Warriors. The college is a member of the National Association of Intercollegiate Athletics (NAIA), primarily competing in the Cascade Collegiate Conference (CCC) since autumn 2020. The Warriors and Lady Warriors previously competed in the Frontier Conference from 1998 to 2000.

LCSC competes in twelve intercollegiate varsity sports: men's sports are baseball, basketball, cross country, golf, tennis, and track & field; women's sports include basketball, cross country, golf, tennis, track & field, and volleyball. The school colors are navy blue, white, and red. The nickname "Warriors" was adopted after the school reopened in 1955; earlier nicknames include "Pioneers" in the 1930s, and "Loggers" in the 1940s and early 1950s.

Baseball
Absent for a decade (1952–1961), baseball returned as an intercollegiate sport in 1962. Since 1984, the team has won nineteen NAIA national championships; sixteen were under head coach Ed Cheff, who retired after 34 years in 2010. LCSC has hosted the NAIA World Series at Harris Field since 2000, and also from 1984 through 1991.

Notable alumni

Baseball players

Marvin Benard (born 1970)
Connor Brogdon (born 1995)
Seth Brown (born 1992)
Vic Darensbourg (born 1970)
Steve Decker (born 1965)
Donnie Ecker (born 1986)
Tom Edens (born 1961)
Jason Ellison (born 1978)
Anthony Ferrari (born 1978)
Carlos Fisher (born 1983)
John Foster (born 1978)
Keith Foulke (born 1972)
Emerson Frostad (born 1983)
Sean Halton (born 1987)
Blaine Hardy (born 1987)
Bucky Jacobsen (born 1975)
Chris Kissock (born 1985)
Chris Mabeus (born 1979)
Steve Reed (born 1965)
Brendan Ryan (born 1982)
Chris Schwinden (born 1986)
Frank Williams (1958–2009)

Other fields
Kim Barnes (born 1958), author
Ed Cheff (1943–2022), college baseball coach
Bryan Fuller (born 1969), television writer and producer
Alex Mallari (born 1987), basketball player
George Pfeifer (born 1955), basketball coach
Aprilynne Pike (born 1980), New York Times best-selling author of young adult fiction
Victor Rojas (born 1968), baseball executive and former Los Angeles Angels play-by-play announcer
Jacob Wiley (born 1994), basketball player
Sam Atkin (born 1993), Track & Field, Olympian, World Championship Qualifier, Professional Runner (Puma Running)

References

External links 
 
 Official athletics website

 
Educational institutions established in 1893
Frontier Conference
Universities and colleges accredited by the Northwest Commission on Colleges and Universities
Buildings and structures in Nez Perce County, Idaho
Education in Nez Perce County, Idaho
Tourist attractions in Nez Perce County, Idaho
1893 establishments in Idaho
Public universities and colleges in Idaho